Cillian Buckley (born 14 July 1992) is an Irish hurler who plays for Kilkenny Senior Championship club Dicksboro and at inter-county level with the Kilkenny senior hurling team. He usually lines out as a left wing-back.

Playing career

St Kieran's College
During his schooling at St Kieran's College in Kilkenny, Buckley established himself as a key member of the senior hurling team. In 2010 he won his first Leinster medal following a 3-13 to 1-11 defeat of Dublin Colleges. On 3 April 2010 St Kieran's faced Ardscoil Rís in the All-Ireland decider. Buckley's side trailed by five points as the game entered the final quarter, however, St. Kieran's staged a magnificent comeback, hitting 1-5 without reply including a Michael Brennan goal in the 51st minute, to claim a 2-11 to 2-8 victory. It was Buckley's first All-Ireland medal.

Buckley added a second successive Leinster medal to his collection in 2011, as St Kieran's recorded a 3-7 to 0-7 victory over Castlecomer Community School. On 2 April 2011 St Kieran's renewed their rivalry with Ardscoil Rís in the All-Ireland final. A Thomas O'Hanrahan goal deep into stoppage time secured a 2-10 to 1-11 victory for St Kieran's and a second All-Ireland medal for Buckley.

Dicksboro
After experiencing championship success in the minor and under-21 grades, Buckley subsequently joined Dicksboro's top team. In 2011 Dicksboro faced Mullinavat in the intermediate championship decider. "The Boro" had the better of the first half and led at the interval by six points. Mullinavat, despite dominating most of the second half, could not turn their possession into enough scores and Dicksboro held out to take a 2-12 to 2-11 victory, with Buckley collecting a championship medal.

Kilkenny

Minor and under-21
Buckley first played for Kilkenny in 2009 when he joined the minor side. He won his first Leinster medal that year following Kilkenny's 1-19 to 0-11 trouncing of Wexford in the provincial decider. Galway provided the opposition in the subsequent All-Ireland decider on 6 September 2009. A devastating second quarter display was pivotal in powering the Westerners to a 2-15 to 2-11 victory.

In 2010 Buckley was appointed captain of the Kilkenny minor team. He won a second Leinster medal that year following a 1-20 to 0-10 trouncing of Dublin. The subsequent All-Ireland decider on 5 September 2010 pitted Kilkenny against Clare. "The Cats" were made to work hard before securing a narrow 2-10 to 0-14 victory, giving Buckley an All-Ireland Minor Hurling Championship medal and the honour of lifting the cup as captain.

Two years later Buckley was a key member of the Kilkenny under-21 team. He won his sole Leinster medal that year following a 4-24 to 1-13 trouncing of Laois. Kilkenny later faced Clare in the All-Ireland decider on 15 September 2012. A powerful second-half display, in which they outscored Kilkenny by 1-10 to 0-4, saw Clare take their second ever All-Ireland title in the grade.

Senior
Buckley made his senior debut for Kilkenny on 12 February 2012 in the final of the pre-season Walsh Cup. He came on as a substitute as Kilkenny defeated Galway to take the title by 2-20 to 1-14. Buckley was a regular during the subsequent league campaign which eventually saw Kilkenny faced old rivals Cork in the decider. A huge 3-21 to 0-16 victory gave him a first National Hurling League medal. Kilkenny were later shocked by Galway in the Leinster decider, losing by 2–21 to 2–11, however, both sides subsequently met in the All-Ireland decider on 9 September 2012. Kilkenny had led going into the final stretch, however, Joe Canning struck a stoppage time equaliser to level the game at 2–13 to 0–19 and send the final to a replay for the first time since 1959. The replay took place three weeks later on 30 September 2012. Galway stunned the reigning champions with two first-half goals, however, Kilkenny's championship debutant Walter Walsh gave a man of the match performance, claiming a 1–3 haul. The 3–22 to 3–11 Kilkenny victory gave Buckley a first All-Ireland medal.

Kilkenny's dominance showed no sign of abating in 2013, with Buckley winning a second successive league medal following a 2–17 to 0–20 defeat of Tipperary in the decider.

In 2014 Buckley collected his third successive league medal, as Kilkenny secured a narrow one-point 2–25 to 1–27 extra-time victory over Tipperary. Buckley subsequently secured his first Leinster medal, as a dominant Kilkenny display gave "The Cats" a 0–14 to 1–9 defeat of Dublin. On 7 September 2014 Kilkenny faced Tipperary in the All-Ireland decider. In what some consider to be the greatest game of all time, the sides were level when Tipperary were awarded a controversial free. John O'Dwyer had the chance to win the game, however, his late free drifted wide resulting in a draw. The replay on 27 September 2014 was also a close affair. Goals from brothers Richie and John Power inspired Kilkenny to a 2–17 to 2–14 victory. It was Buckley's second All-Ireland medal, while he was later presented with an All-Star.

Buckley won a second successive Leinster medal in 2015 following a 1-25 to 2-15 defeat of Galway in the provincial decider.
Kilkenny subsequently  defeated Galway in the All-Ireland final, earning Cillian his third Celtic Cross.

Honours

Team
St Kieran's College
 All-Ireland Colleges Senior Hurling Championship (2): 2010, 2011
 Leinster Colleges Senior Hurling Championship (2): 2010, 2011

Dicksboro
 Kilkenny Senior Hurling Championship (1): 2017
 Kilkenny Intermediate Hurling Championship (1): 2010
 Leinster Intermediate Club Hurling Championship (1): 2010
 Kilkenny Under-21 Hurling Championship (1): 2009
 Kilkenny Minor Hurling Championship (2): 2009, 2010

Kilkenny
 All-Ireland Senior Hurling Championship (3): 2012, 2014, 2015
 Leinster Senior Hurling Championship (3): 2014, 2015, 2016
 National Hurling League (4): 2012, 2013, 2014, 2018
 Walsh Cup (1): 2012
 Leinster Under-21 Hurling Championship (1): 2012
 All-Ireland Minor Hurling Championship (1): 2010 (c)
 Leinster Minor Hurling Championship (2) 2009, 2010 (c)

Individual
Awards
 GAA-GPA All-Star (2): 2014, 2015

References

External link
Cillian Buckley profile  at the Kilkenny GAA website

1992 births
Living people
All-Ireland Senior Hurling Championship winners
All Stars Awards winners (hurling)
Dicksboro hurlers
Hurling backs
Kilkenny inter-county hurlers